Philippa Mary "Pip" Gould, later Philippa Gower, (born 4 December 1940) is a former backstroke swimmer from New Zealand. She competed at the 1956 Summer Olympics placing sixth in her heat of the 100 m backstroke. In January 1957, she broke the 200 m (220 yd) backstroke world record, and in March 1958, she broke the 100 m (110 yd) backstroke record, while still a student at St Cuthbert's College, Auckland.

At the 1958 British Empire and Commonwealth Games she won the bronze medal in the 110 yd backstroke. In 1995 Gould was inducted into the New Zealand Sports Hall of Fame. Philippa also in 1957 was the Halberg Sportswoman of the year now known as the ISPS Handa Halberg Awards. To this day she still teaches and continues to swim competing in harbour swims. In 2017 her granddaughter Annabelle entered her into the Masters World Games. Philippa competed in the 50m and 200m backstroke winning Silver in both events. She also won gold in the 100m backstroke.

References

External links

 

1940 births
Living people
Olympic swimmers of New Zealand
Swimmers at the 1956 Summer Olympics
Commonwealth Games medallists in swimming
Commonwealth Games bronze medallists for New Zealand
Swimmers at the 1958 British Empire and Commonwealth Games
People educated at St Cuthbert's College, Auckland
Medallists at the 1958 British Empire and Commonwealth Games